The O&N Subdivision is a railroad line owned by CSX Transportation in the U.S. state of Kentucky. At its south end the track comes to an end and at its north end the track continues south from the Henderson Subdivision MH&E Branch.

See also
 List of CSX Transportation lines

References

CSX Transportation lines
Transportation in Muhlenberg County, Kentucky
Transportation in McLean County, Kentucky